Marvelous Cornelius:  Hurricane Katrina and the Spirit of New Orleans is a semi-biographical picture book written by Phil Bildner, illustrated by John Parra, and published August 4, 2015 by Chronicle Books. The book, which is based on a true story, follows Cornelius after he cleans up New Orleans after Hurricane Katrina.

Reception 
Marvelous Cornelius was met with praise, applauding the message of the impact of individuals' efforts. While some reviews discussed how the book served as a "stirring story of resilience in the face of adversity" or a "fine tribute to an unsung African-American hero," others noted that the book "[e]mphasize[d] the vibrant life before Hurricane Katrina and makes the impact of the terrible flood."

Marvelous Cornelius received a starred review from Shelf Awareness, as well as positive reviews from Kirkus, School Library Journal, Booklist, USA Today.

Beyond popular media, Marvelous Cornelius has also been discussed in academic circles to review the stories told to children about working-class Americans and tragedy.

References 

2015 children's books
Chronicle Books books